Stamen Angelov (born 1 June 1987) is a Bulgarian footballer who currently plays as a midfielder for Nesebar.

Awards
 Champion of B PFG 2013 (with Neftochimic Burgas)

References

External links

1987 births
Living people
Bulgarian footballers
FC Etar 1924 Veliko Tarnovo players
Neftochimic Burgas players
PFC Chernomorets Burgas players
PFC Cherno More Varna players
PFC Nesebar players
First Professional Football League (Bulgaria) players
Association football midfielders